is a Gundam comic title created by Mizuho Takayama (illustration) and Yuka Minakawa (script). It was premiered on the November 2006 issue of Comic Bom Bom. The prologue chapter Gundam ALIVE Episode 0 is published in Gundam Magazine which was bundled with the November 2006 issue of Comic Bom Bom.

This is a completely new story with no relation to previous Gundam series. Set in the 21st century (present time) with Japan as the main stage where a mysterious army has invaded with super weapons called Mobile Suits, the protagonist stand against them with a mobile suit called "Gundam".

Story
The year is 200X. A mysterious robot fell from the sky into Tokyo. The robot is called a "Mobile Suit". Meanwhile, another Mobile Suit named "Gundam" crash landed near Kurono...

Characters

Main Characters
Tokio Kurono (黒野時夫(くろのときお))
The protagonist of the story.  A secondary school year 2 student and a regular of the soccer club.  Kurono always believed that he possess some hidden talent.
First piloted the Gundam to fend off the Zakus that were chasing Aiko.  He is still an amateur at piloting MS and was beaten badly in the first few confrontation with the mysterious enemy.  Currently he is undergoing MS training at the Nishimikado House.
In the second battle against Blitz, Kurono has shown Newtype abilities.

Aiko Anna Pruna (アイコ・アンナ・プルナ)
A spacenoid.  The original pilot of the Gundam. Aiko and her brother was attacked in the midst of transporting a new MS and crash landed on Earth where she meets Kurono.  Aiko was amazed at Kurono's ability to pilot the MS when he took over the controls from the then injured her.
She appears to be from the future of another dimension. She was really excited when Kurono brought milk for her as she say farming in space colonies is difficult and milk is expensive there.

Sakuya Nishimikado (西御門朔也(にしみかど さくや))
A secondary school year 3 student in the same school Kurona attend.  But actually he is the 18th head of the Nishimikado family that has been protecting the "Gundam" for 500 years therefore it is not strange that he is an expert at piloting MS. The Nishimikado family has a big corporation and owns a large-scale MS factory.
The ancestor of the Nishimikado family is Morris Aluna Pruna, Aiko's brother, who too fell to Earth but to a time 500 years before. So it makes Aiko the grandaunt of Sakuya. Sakuya also pilots the Moless' Zeta Gundam but now outfitted with musha armour.

Retsu Domyouji (道明寺烈(どうみょうじ れつ))
The pilot of Shining Gundam.  A childhood friend of Sakuya. A monk of the Domyouji family, he broke the rule of not fighting and used Shining Gundam to save Kurono.  A skilled fighter that can unleash the power of Shining Gundam in battle without regret.

K2
So far the antagonist. He appeared piloting a Gundam X which attacked Aiko and Morris.  He and his troops too had descended on Earth to pursue the Gundam.  He later retrieved a H.L.V from the ocean.  He has set up a dimensional gate on an island which brought the 5 Gundams from Gundam SEED to their time. He is always seen with sunglasses on.

Other characters
Tokio's sister
No name mentioned yet. After their parents died, she and her brother Tokio lived together. She got Aiko to live together with them and treats her like a family member.

Yamanouchi (山之内)
Butler of the Nishimikado family, the person who provides support for Sakuya in various aspects.

Morris Aluna Pruna (モーリス・エルナ・プルナ)
Aiko's brother and the former pilot of the Z Gundam. Became missing after Aiko and the Gundam was attacked by Gundam X in the midst of its transportation. But actually he fell into a time slip and ended up in Japan 500 years ago, he started the Nishimikado family and remained in the area. His Z Gundam is passed down to later generations of the Nishimikado family.

Mobile Units 
Many units from the previous Gundam series appeared and will appear in this series.  Here is a list of the main units.

Gundam
First piloted by Aiko then now Kurono.  In episode 6 Aiko speak of it as a "special machine". It is revealed in episode 11 that this Gundam has some sort of Psychomu system equipped.

Zeta Gundam
First piloted by Moless then now Sakuya. Since the falling of the Zeta Gundam it has been passed down from generations in the Nishimikado family for 500 years. The Zeta Gundam now is clad in musha armour and has a katana as its main armament. However in episode 0 Sakuya is seen piloting the Zeta Gundam without the armour.

Gundam X
The first MS piloted by the mysterious sunglasses man which he used to attack Aiko and Moless.

Sword Strike Gundam
The MS that appeared out of the dimensional gate with 4 other MS in episode 7.

See also 
 Mizuho Takayama

Note

External links 
 Yuka Minakawa homepage 
 review of Gundam ALIVE  

Alive
Shōnen manga